Bingham is a surname of English origin, ultimately deriving from the toponym of Melcombe Bingham in Dorset.
The name was taken to Ireland in the 16th century, by Richard Bingham, a native of Dorset who was appointed governor of Connaught in 1584. 
There is another Bingham in 
Nottinghamshire.

People surnamed Bingham include:

British 

Aristocrats:

Bingham Baronets, of Castlebar (created 1634)
Sir Henry Bingham, 1st Baronet (1573 – c. 1658)
Sir George Bingham, 2nd Baronet (c. 1625 – 1682)
Sir Henry Bingham, 3rd Baronet (died c. 1714)
Sir George Bingham, 4th Baronet (died c. 1730)
Sir John Bingham, 5th Baronet (c. 1696 – 1749)
Sir John Bingham, 6th Baronet (1730–1750) 
Sir Charles Bingham, 7th Baronet (1735–1799) 
Earls of Lucan (second creation (1795)
Charles Bingham, 1st Earl of Lucan (1735–1799)
Richard Bingham, 2nd Earl of Lucan (1764–1839)
George Bingham, 3rd Earl of Lucan (1800–1888)
Charles Bingham, 4th Earl of Lucan (1830–1914)
George Bingham, 5th Earl of Lucan (1860–1949)
George Bingham, 6th Earl of Lucan (1898–1964)
Richard John Bingham, 7th Earl of Lucan (b. 1934, missing since 1974, presumed dead – death certificate issued 2016)  the infamous "Lord Lucan" who disappeared after murdering his nanny when intending to murder his wife
George Charles Bingham, 8th Earl of Lucan (born 1967)
Baron Clanmorris (created 1800)
John Bingham, 1st Baron Clanmorris (1762–1821)
Charles Barry Bingham, 2nd Baron Clanmorris (1796–1829)
Denis Arthur Bingham, 3rd Baron Clanmorris (1808–1847)
John Charles Robert Bingham, 4th Baron Clanmorris (1826–1876)
John George Barry Bingham, 5th Baron Clanmorris (1852–1916)
Arthur Maurice Robert Bingham, 6th Baron Clanmorris (1879–1960)
John Michael Ward Bingham, 7th Baron Clanmorris (1908–1988),  MI5 spy and novelist
Simon John Ward Bingham, 8th Baron Clanmorris (born 1937)
Robert Derek de Burgh Bingham (born 1942)

Law:
Tom Bingham, Baron Bingham of Cornhill, one of the most senior judges in the United Kingdom
Peregrine Bingham the Elder, biographer and poet 
Peregrine Bingham the Younger, English legal writer
Lady Camilla Bingham KC (born 1970)

Mathematics and Science:
Nicholas Bingham (1945), British mathematician
Dame Kate Bingham, bioscientist, venture capitalist and Head of UK's Vaccine Taskforce

Military & Navy:
Arthur Bingham, Captain in the Royal Navy
Cecil Edward Bingham, General in the British Army
Charles Thomas Bingham (1848–1908), Irish Army officer, entomologist and naturalist in India
Edward Bingham, Rear-Admiral of the British Royal Navy during the First World War
Edward W. Bingham, polar explorer
Peregrine Bingham the Elder, biographer and poet
Richard Bingham (soldier)

Religion:
Joseph Bingham (1668–1723), English scholar and divine

Sport:
Billy Bingham (1931-2022), Northern Irish footballer
Craig Bingham, Scottish footballer
Stuart Bingham, an English Snooker player, world snooker champion 2015

Writers
Madeleine Bingham, Baroness Clanmorris (1912-1988), English writer and wife of 7th Baron

American 

Artists & Writers:
George Caleb Bingham, 19th-century American realist artist
Henrietta A. Bingham (1841–1877), American writer, editor, preceptress
Howard Bingham, photographer
Jennie M. Bingham, American writer
Robert Bingham, American writer

Film industry workers:
J. Michael Bingham, pseudonym of D. C. Fontana, screenplay writer
Traci Bingham, American actress & model

Law:
Robert Worth Bingham, lawyer, US Ambassador to the United Kingdom, and owner of the Courier-Journal newspaper of Louisville, Kentucky
Stephen Bingham is a progressive activist and legal services attorney in San Francisco 
Theodore A. Bingham, Brigadier General and New York City Police Commissioner 
Gwen Bingham, first female Commanding Officer of TACOM

Mathematics & Science:
Caroline Priscilla Bingham (née Lord 1831–1932), American botanist
Christopher Bingham, American statistician who introduced the Bingham distribution and jointly with other introduced complex demodulation into Fourier analysis of time series
Harold Clyde Bingham, psychologist and primatologist
Hiram Bingham III, explorer and U.S. Senator, best known as rediscoverer of sacred Inca city of Machu Picchu
Eugene C. Bingham, a professor at Lafayette College who coined the term rheology
Millicent Todd Bingham, Geographer, first woman to receive a doctorate in geology and geography from Harvard University
Paul M. Bingham is an American molecular biologist and evolutionary theorist

Missionaries:
Hiram Bingham I, missionary to the Kingdom of Hawai'i
Hiram Bingham II, missionary to the Kingdom of Hawai'i

Pioneers:
Erastus Bingham, Latter Day Saint Pioneer, wagon train leader, founder of Bingham's Fort, early settler of Ogden, Utah, first LDS bishop of Ogden.

Politicians:
E. Volney Bingham (1844–1922), Indiana state legislator
Henry H. Bingham, United States Civil War Hero and Congressman from Pennsylvania
Hiram Bingham IV, US Vice Consul in Marseille, France, during World War II, who rescued Jews from the Holocaust
James Bingham, Indiana Attorney General
James M. Bingham, Wisconsin state legislator
John Bingham, U.S. Representative from Ohio during the Reconstruction
Jonathan Brewster Bingham, U.S. Representative from New York
Kinsley S. Bingham, U.S. Representative, U.S. Senator, and Governor of Michigan
Stan Bingham, North Carolina state legislator
William Bingham, Senator in the early USA
William Bingham (Pittsburgh), Mayor of Pittsburgh, Pennsylvania, 1856 to 1857.

Publishers:
Barry Bingham Sr., owner and publisher of Pulitzer Prize–winning Courier-Journal newspaper of Louisville, Kentucky
Barry Bingham Jr., editor and publisher of Pulitzer Prize–winning Courier-Journal newspaper of Louisville, Kentucky
Henrietta Bingham, American journalist and horse breeder associated with Bloomsbury GroupSports''':
Craig Bingham (American football), Jamaican-born American football player
Dave Bingham, American college baseball coach
Don Bingham, American football player
Marcus Bingham Jr. (born 2000), American basketball player

Others
Max Bingham, Australian politician in the Tasmanian House of Assembly
Mark Bingham, a leader of the attempted passenger revolt against hijackers aboard United Airlines Flight 93
Tyler Bingham, US-American Criminal

See also
Bingham (disambiguation)

References

English-language surnames
English toponymic surnames